The river Kladeos flows through Olympia in Elis, Southern Greece, and empties into the river Alfeios. As a tributary of the Alfeios, the Kladeos is fed by the Plataneiko, Lagadino, Gani, and Liakoto streams. Already in classical antiquity, the river was diverted near Olympia in order to prevent flooding in winter. However, the sanctuary of Olympia was covered by a 4 m thick layer of sediment when it was excavated in 1875.

The river is named after Kladeos, a river god in Greek mythology who was one of the sons of Oceanus and Tethys.

References

External links

Rivers of Greece
Landforms of Elis
Rivers of Western Greece
Potamoi